Randolph is an unincorporated community in Fannin County, Texas, United States. Randolph has a post office with the ZIP code 75475.  This is not to be confused with Randolph in Trinity County, Texas.

See also

References

External links

Unincorporated communities in Fannin County, Texas
Unincorporated communities in Texas